Greg Simms is a former Democratic member of the Indiana House of Representatives, he represented the 10th District from 2007 to 2008. He is an educator at Washington Township High School in Valparaiso, Indiana. Simms was elected to the Porter County Council District 3 seat in November 2018. Simms currently teaches Government, U.S. History, and Economics.

References

External links
Indiana State Legislature - Representative Greg Simms Official government website
Project Vote Smart - Representative Greg Simms (IN) profile

Democratic Party members of the Indiana House of Representatives
Living people
Year of birth missing (living people)